WMYJ-FM (88.9 FM) was a radio station licensed to Oolitic, Indiana, United States, that served the Bloomington, Indiana area. The station was owned by Spirit Educational Radio  that broadcasts a Southern gospel format.

History
The station went on the air as WXVW on 1998-12-03. On 2002-09-30, the station changed its call sign to WXVW, on 2005-07-14 to WMYJ, on 2005-11-29 to WMYJ-FM, on 2013-12-02 to WDCK, and on 2016-11-21 to WMYJ-FM.

On November 21, 2016, WDCK changed their call letters to WMYJ-FM and changed their format to southern gospel, branded as "My Joy 88.9" (calls and format moved from 101.1 FM Bloomfield, IN, which took the WDCK calls and began stunting with Christmas music.)

References

External links

Radio stations established in 2006
2006 establishments in Indiana
Southern Gospel radio stations in the United States
MYJ-FM